September 30 - Eastern Orthodox liturgical calendar - October 2

All fixed commemorations below celebrated on October 14 by Eastern Orthodox Churches on the Old Calendar.

For October 1st, Orthodox Churches on the Old Calendar commemorate the Saints listed on September 18.

Feasts
 The Protection of Our Most Holy Lady Theotokos and Ever-Virgin Mary, at the Blachernae church in Constantinople (911)  (see also: October 28 - Greek Orthodox Church)

Saints
 Saint Ananias of Damascus, Bishop and one of the Seventy Apostles (1st century)
 Martyr Domninus of Thessalonica (4th century)
 King Mirian III of Iberia (c. 361) and Queen Nana of Mtskheta (c. 364) - Equals-of-the-Apostles, St. Abiathar of Mtskheta, and St. Sidonia, disciple of St. Nina (4th century) 
 Venerable Romanos the Melodist, "Sweet-singer" (c. 556)
 Monk-Martyrs Michael, Abbot of Zovia Monastery near Sebaste, and 36 fathers with him (c. 790)  (see also: October 2)
 Venerable Melchizedek I, Catholicos-Patriarch of Georgia (c. 1030)

Pre-Schism Western saints
 Saint Piatus of Tournai, he enlightened the areas around Tournai in Belgium and Chartres in France (c. 286)
 Martyrs Verissimus, Maxima and Julia, in Portugal under Diocletian (c. 302)
 Martyrs Aretas, and five-hundred-and-four other martyrs, at Rome.
 Saint Aladius (Albaud), Bishop of Toul in France. (c. 520)
 Saint Wasnulf (died c. 650), missionary in Condé-sur-l'Escaut in Hainaut, Austrasia.
 Saint Bavo of Ghent, penitent and hermit, confessor and patron of Haarlem in the Netherlands (659)
 Saint Dodo, Abbot of Wallers-en-Faigne (750)
 Saint Fidharleus, restorer of the monastery of Rathin in Ireland (762)
 Martyr-prince Mylor of Brittany (Melorius).
 Saint Virila, Abbot of the Monastery of the Saviour in Leyre in Spain (c. 1000)

Post-Schism Orthodox saints
 Saint Gregory the Singer of the Great Lavra of Mount Athos (Gregory Domesticus) (1355)
 Saint John Kukuzelis of Mount Athos (1360)
 Venerable Sabbas, abbot of Vishera in Novgorod, the Wonderworker (1461)

New Martys and Confessors
 New Hieromartyr Alexis Stavrovsky, priest (1918)
 New Hieromartyr Michael (Vologodsky), priest of Krasnoyarsk (1920).
 New Hieromartyr George (Archangelsky), priest (1937)
 New Hieromartyrs Alexander Agafonikov, Gregory, Nicholas Kuligin, priests (1937)
 Martyr John Artemov (1937)
 New Hieromartyr Archpriest Ismael (Rozhdestvensky) of Strelna, St. Petersburg (1938)
 New Hieromartyr Theodore (1940)

Other commemorations
 Commemoration of the Apparition of the Pillar over the Robe of the Lord at Mtskheta, Georgia (c. 330)
 Translation of the relics of Saint Remigius of Rheims, Apostle to the Franks (533)  (see also: January 13)
 Synaxis of the Most-Holy Theotokos Gorgoepikoos ("She who is quick to hear"), at the Dochiariou monastery on Mount Athos (1664)
 Synaxis of the Saints of Moldova.
 Repose of Hiero-schemamonk Euthemius of Valaam (1829)

Icons
 Icon of the Most Holy Theotokos “Pokrov” (Pskov-Protection Icon of the Most Holy Theotokos) (1581)
 Icon of the Theotokos of Brayiliv-Pochaiv (Brailovska) at Brayiliv near Vinnitsa.
 Icon of the Most Holy Theotokos Lublin (Liublinsk)
 Transfer of the Terebovlya Icon of the Most Holy Mother of God from Terebovlya to Lvov (1672)
 Icon of the Mother of God of Gerbovets (Herbovetska) (1790, 1859)
 Icon of the Mother of God of Kasperov (Kasperivska), defended the city of Odessa during the Crimean War (1853-1855)
 Icon of the Mother of God of Barsk (Barska) (1887)
 Icon of the Mother of God “Eleutherotrias” (Deliveress) (1889)  (see also: October 17, October 28 and April 4)

Icon gallery

Notes

References

Sources 
 October 1/14. Orthodox Calendar (PRAVOSLAVIE.RU).
 October 14 / October 1. HOLY TRINITY RUSSIAN ORTHODOX CHURCH (A Parish of the Patriarchate of Moscow).
 October 1. OCA - The Lives of the Saints.
 October 1. Latin Saints of the Orthodox Patriarchate of Rome.
 The Roman Martyrology. Transl. by the Archbishop of Baltimore. Last Edition, According to the Copy Printed at Rome in 1914. Revised Edition, with the Imprimatur of His Eminence Cardinal Gibbons. Baltimore: John Murphy Company, 1916. pp. 303–304.
 Rev. Richard Stanton. A Menology of England and Wales, or, Brief Memorials of the Ancient British and English Saints Arranged According to the Calendar, Together with the Martyrs of the 16th and 17th Centuries. London: Burns & Oates, 1892. pp. 468–470.

 Greek Sources
 Great Synaxaristes:  1 ΟΚΤΩΒΡΙΟΥ . ΜΕΓΑΣ ΣΥΝΑΞΑΡΙΣΤΗΣ.
  Συναξαριστής. 1 Οκτωβρίου. ECCLESIA.GR. (H ΕΚΚΛΗΣΙΑ ΤΗΣ ΕΛΛΑΔΟΣ).

 Russian Sources
  14 октября (1 октября). Православная Энциклопедия под редакцией Патриарха Московского и всея Руси Кирилла (электронная версия). (Orthodox Encyclopedia - Pravenc.ru).
  1 октября (ст.ст.) 14 октября 2013 (нов. ст.). Русская Православная Церковь Отдел внешних церковных связей. (DECR).
  1 октября по старому стилю  /  14 октября по новому стилю. Русская Православная Церковь - Православный церковный календарь на 2016 год.

October in the Eastern Orthodox calendar